Complete Recordings is a 1999 compilation album by the indie pop band Black Tambourine. Despite its title, it does not actually contain the complete recordings of the band. The later album Black Tambourine featured six additional tracks, thus replacing this album.

Reception

Track listing
All tracks are written by Black Tambourine, except where noted.

 "For Ex-Lovers Only" - 2:41
 "Black Car" - 3:29
 "Pack You Up" - 2:27
 "Can't Explain" (John Echols, John Fleck, Arthur Lee) - 2:24
 "I Was Wrong" - 1:36
 "Throw Aggi Off the Bridge" - 3:18
 "Drown" - 2:42
 "We Can't Be Friends" - 1:50
 "By Tomorrow" - 3:05
 "Pam's Tan" - 1:20

Reception

1999 compilation albums
Black Tambourine albums